During the 1947–48 season Hibernian, a football club based in Edinburgh, came first out of 16 clubs in the Scottish First Division.

Scottish First Division

Final League table

Scottish League Cup

Group stage

Group 4 final table

Scottish Cup

See also
List of Hibernian F.C. seasons

References

External links
Hibernian 1947/1948 results and fixtures, Soccerbase

Scottish football championship-winning seasons
Hibernian F.C. seasons
Hibernian